Warwick River is the name of several rivers:

In New Zealand
Warwick River (New Zealand)

In the United States
Warwick River (Maryland)
Warwick River (Virginia)
Warwick River Shire, a former division of Virginia